Delfini (trans. The Dolphins) were a Yugoslav band formed in Split in 1963. They were one of the pioneers of the Yugoslav rock scene.

In the 1960s the band performed beat music, gaining a reputation as one of the best Yugoslav beat bands. In the late 1960s they moved towards pop. They continued their career as a pop band throughout the 1970s, disbanding at the end of the decade.

History

1963–1979
Delfini were formed in Split in 1963. The band went through several lineup changes before a firm lineup was formed: Željko Šoletić (vocals), Zdravko Botrić (guitar), Saša Lukić (keyboards), Ante Cetinić (bass guitar) and Damir Blažević (drums). Blažević was at one point replaced by Peco Petej (who would in the 1970s perform in the bands Time and Indexi). The band gained attention of the public with their appearance on a concert in Croatian National Theatre in Split organized by the Association of Musicians of Split.

In 1964 the band performed on a number of concerts entitled Prvi pljesak (The First Applause), organized by Mozaik (Mosaic) Society for Culture and Arts. They spent the summer of 1964 performing in Palas hotel on the island of Hvar. After their return to their hometown, they held their first solo concert, on which they performed with saxophonist Igor Lučer and trumpeter Tonči Puharič. The band started to hold concerts in the cellars of Diocletian's Palace in Split, with up to 1,500 members of the audience per performance. The band would perform in the Palace cellars throughout 1965 and 1966. Thanks to their live performances and the fact that all of the members had formal music education, Delfini gained the reputation as one of the best Yugoslav bands, which gave them the opportunity to perform during 1965 as a backing band for a number of popular Yugoslav singers: Arsen Dedić (who would describe them as "the best beat band in Yugoslavia"), Ivica Šerfezi, Zdenka Vučković, Ana Štefok, Vice Vukov and others. In the mid-1960s the band was joined by new guitarist, Pavle Koralov.

In 1966 the band applied for the Melodije Jadrana 66 (Melodies of the Adriatic 66) music festival with the song "More i ljeto" ("Sea and Summer"), composed by Lukić. Delfini wanted to perform the song themselves, but the festival organizers decided the song should be performed by a female vocalist, singer Maruška Šinković ending up performing it. Delfini were offered to appear on the festival performing the song "Ča se noćas svitli luka" ("Why Is the Harbor So Bright This Evening"), which they refused. This event gained large attention of the media and the public support for the band by some popular singers. In 1967 the band signed a contract with Split tourist company Primorje (Seashore). The intention of the company was to create the city summer garden on a devastated field, and Delfini were hired to perform in the garden. After the garden was opened, it became the gathering place for the Split youth, with Delfini performing there every evening from 8:00 pm to 23:30 pm, with 1,000 to 1,500 people visiting each of their performances. In 1967 the band competed on the second edition of the Belgrade Gitarijada Festival, winning the second place, behind Crni Biseri. The band would also compete on the second edition of the Festival of Vocal-Instrumental Ensembles in Zagreb, held on 14 May 1967, where they also won the second place, behind Kameleoni. On the 1967 Split festival, they played the song "Beat na moru" ("Beat on the Seashore"), a Serbo-Croatian cover of the song "Running Out of the World", performed by the British band The Shadows on the same festival. "Beat na moru" was released on the festival official EP Split '67, becoming a hit for the band.

At the beginning of 1968 the band moved to the country's capital, Belgrade, with an intention to gain nationwide popularity. They held 11 concerts in Belgrade Youth Center, and soon gained an opportunity to appear in the popular TV show Koncert za mladi ludi svet (Concert for Young Crazy World) and were offered a record contract by the PGP-RTB record label. In 1968 they released their debut record, the EP Naša serenada (Our Serenade). All four songs on the EP were authored by the band members, which was rare at the time, as 1960s Yugoslav rock bands would usually include covers of foreign rock hits on their records. The title track featured elements of folk music of Dalmatia, while the song "Sedam koraka" ("Seven Steps") featured elements of Macedonian traditional music. The song "Dioklecijan" ("Diocletian") was co-written by Toma Bebić (who would later gain fame as a singer-songwriter). This song is notable as the first song in the history of Yugoslav rock music to feature the technique of backmasking.

After the EP release the band would start to move away from rock and towards pop scene. However, they also included a number of soul songs into their repertoire, and were joined by two new members, saxophone player Igor Lučer and trumpet player Tonči Puharič, both of which previously appeared on the band's concerts as guests. In the following years they moved back to Split and played as a backing band for a number of singers, played on fashion shows and often appeared on Radio Belgrade and Radio Zagreb. In the 1970s they got a new singer, Tonči Della Zotta. They released a number of pop-oriented 7" singles, often appeared on Yugoslav pop festivals and went on several Soviet Union tours. They ended their activity at the end of the decade, occasionally reuniting in the following decades under the name Dupini (a regional expression, also meaning The Dolphins).

Discography

EPs
Naša serenada (1968)

Compilation albums
Hitovi (1984)
Hitovi II (1988)

Singles
"Kako je toplo ovo ljeto" / "Mini-bikini" (1973)
"Tonbula" / "Dobro jutro, draga" (1976)
"Od portuna do portuna" / "Radio i mikrofon" (1977)
"Od ponedjeljka novi život" / "Intima" (1979)
"Čobanica" / "Srce samo jednom voli" (1979)
"Prijateljstvo" / "Natanijel" (1979)

Other appearances
"Beat na moru" (Split '67, 1967)

References

External links 
Delfini at Discogs

Croatian rock music groups
Yugoslav rock music groups
Beat groups
Musical groups established in 1962
Musical groups disestablished in 1979